Ritson's North-Country Chorister , Edited and published by Joseph Ritson, is a revised edition of a book on Durham music, published in 1809.

Details 

 Ritson's North-Country Chorister  (or to give it its full title - “The North-Country Chorister; An unparalleled variety of excellent songs. Collected and published together, for general Amusement, by a Bishoprick Ballad-Singer [Edited by the Late Joseph Ritson, Esq.] ---- To drink good ale to clear my throat, To hear the bagpipes sprightly note, This is the life that pleaseth me. To ramble round the North Country, ---- Durham: printed by  L. Pennington, Bookseller.   MDCCCII   Licensed and entered according to Order ---- London: reprinted for Robert Triphook, 37, St. Jame's Street. By Harding and Wright, St. John's-square ---- 1809”) is a book of North Eastern folk songs consisting of 20 pages with 6 works, first published in 1802 and reprinted (this edition) in 1809.

Other books in Ritson’s Garland series were Ritson's Bishopric Garland, The Yorkshire Garland and The Northumberland Garland. A compilation of the whole series, entitled The Northern Garland was published in 1810.

The “Garland” series were important, not only as important document in their own right, but as one of the main sources of similar successor publications such as John Bell's Rhymes of Northern Bards and Bruce and Stokoe's Northumbrian Minstrelsy.

A set of original documents are held in The Robinson Library of Newcastle University

The publication 
The front cover of the book was as thus :-

THE<br/ >
North-Country<br/ >
CHORISTER; <br/ >
AN<br/ >
UNPARALLELED VARIETY<br/ >
OF<br/ >
EXCELENT SONGS. <br/ >
Collected and published together, for<br/ >
general Amusement, <br/ >
BY<br/ >
A BISHOPRICK BALLAD-SINGER<br/ >
[EDITED BY THE LATE<br/ >
JOSEPH RITSON, ESQ.] <br/ >
- - - - - - -<br/ >
To drink good ale to clear my throat, <br/ >
To hear the bagpipes sprightly note, <br/ >
To ramble round the North Country, <br/ >
This is the life that pleaseth me. <br/ >
- - - - - - -<br/ >
DURHAM: <br/ >
PRINTED BY L. PENNINGTON, BOOKSELLER<br/ >.
MDCCCII<br/ >
Licensed and entered according to Order<br/ >
- - - - - - -<br/ >
LONDON: <br/ >
REPRINTED FOR ROBERT TRIPHOOK, 37, ST. JAME'S STREET. <br/ >
By Harding and Wright, St. John's-square. <br/ >
- - - - - - -<br/ >
1809

Contents 
are as below :-<br/ >

See also 
Geordie dialect words
Joseph Ritson
Ritson's Northern Garlands 1810<br/ >
Ritson's Bishopric Garland or Durham Minstrel 1792
Ritson's Yorkshire Garland 1809
Ritson's Northumberland Garland or Newcastle Nightingale 1809

References

External links
 Allan’s Illustrated Edition of Tyneside songs and readings - page 512
 Google e-book Northern Garland
 Google e-book

Books by Joseph Ritson
Songs related to Newcastle upon Tyne
Northumbrian folklore
Geordie songwriters
Chapbooks
Song books